Cheng Hong (born 21 November 1957) is a Chinese professor at the Capital University of Economics and Business and the wife of the former Chinese premier Li Keqiang.

Biography 
Cheng was born in Zhengzhou, Henan, in 1957. She secondary studied at Zhengzhou No.7 Middle School. During the Cultural Revolution, she became a sent-down youth in Guangkuo Tiandi Township, Jia County, Henan. After the resumption of college entrance examination in 1977, she was accepted to the PLA College of Foreign Languages (now PLA Information Engineering University). After graduation, she engaged in advanced studies at Tsinghua University, where she met her future husband Li Keqiang.

In 1995, Cheng was a visiting scholar in the United States at Brown University, Rhode Island. Cheng taught at Beijing Institute of Economics (Capital University of Economics and Business).

Considered one of the leading Chinese scholars of American nature writing, as of 2012 she had published two books on the subject and translated several books from English to Chinese, including The Singing Wilderness, and The Outermost House.

In 1991 Cheng translated the BBC book about the popular British TV series, Yes Minister.

Personal life
Cheng's husband is Li Keqiang, former Premier of the People's Republic of China. They have one daughter who studied in the United States and has since returned to China.

See also
 Peng Liyuan

References

Li Keqiang family
Professorships in literature
Spouses of national leaders
Living people
1957 births
People from Zhengzhou